Lieutenant John Gordon Gillanders (1895-1946) was a World War I flying ace credited with five aerial victories.

Sources of information

References

1895 births
1946 deaths
Canadian military personnel from Ontario
Canadian military personnel of World War I
Canadian World War I flying aces
Royal Flying Corps officers
Recipients of the Distinguished Flying Cross (United Kingdom)